Vlado Martek (born 1951) is a Croatian artist whose work is based on visualising poetry. In his art pieces he works with poems and fragments of poems by putting them into collages, photographs, plots, graphics, sketches, drawings, art actions and agitations, graffiti and wallpapers. Vlado Martek lives in Zagreb, where he works as a librarian since 1979.

Life and work
Vlado Martek was born in Zagreb (SR Croatia) where he studied philosophy and literature at Zagreb University. In the early 1970s Martek wanted more than writing poems. The first work he installed in public was a wallpaper-action with the photographer Željko Jerman and the art-student Boris Demur. In 1975 he founded the Group of Six Artists (Grupa šestorice autora) with Mladen and Sven Stilinović, Fedor Vučemilović, Boris Demur and Željko Jerman. Active until 1979, they performed over 20 art pieces in Zagreb and launched the magazine MAJ/75 (1978 – 1984).

Martek`s work is based on the discourse between art, philosophy and poetry. He is working with the negation and construction of words to create a reality behind the letters. He describes his work as Pre-poetry - the reduction and concentration of poem. In his own words: “Pre-poetry is controlling, an evasion into space before writing, controlling my head, my motives as to why I write, my responsibility, a tidying up before I write a poem. In that sense it is a provocation in language, by destruction but also construction.“  Martek uses critical, ironic and analytic methods to question social structures in combination with a wide range of media and materials.

Solo exhibitions

 2014: Piktogramska abeceda, Galerija Galženica, Velika Gorica
 2012: The Power of Support / Die Kraft des Untergrunds, Aanant & Zoo, Berlin
 2011: Lisez Mallarmé, Galerie Frank Elbaz, Paris
 2010: Poetry in Action, Galerie P – 74, Ljubljana & Gallery Kraljević, Zagreb
 2008: Retrospective, Modern Gallery, Zagreb
 2004: Small Exhibition, Mala Galerija, Museum of Modern Art, Ljubljana
 1998: Samizdats, City Library, Zagreb
 1996: Troubles with the Content, Galerie Zvonimir, Zagreb; Troubles with Ethics, Š-O-U-Galerija Kapelica, Ljubljana
 1988: Arbeiten auf Papier, Galerie Ingird Dacić, Tübingen
 1985: Vlado Martek - Hermafroditski bojevnik, Galerija Skuc, Ljubljana
 1984: Vlado Martek, Galerija Skuc, Ljubljana
 1982: (Pre)poetry environment, Studio Gallery of Contemporary Art, Zagreb
 1980: Book-Work (with Mladen Stilinovic), Galerie Studentskog centra, Zagreb
 1979: Elementary processes in poetry, Podroom, Zagreb

Group exhibitions
 2012: The Present and Presence, Moderna Galerija, Ljubljana
 2011: MULTIPLIZIEREN IST MENSCHLICH, Edition Block, Berlin
 2010: You Are Kindly Invited To Attend, Aanant & Zoo, Berlin
 2009: Who killed the Painting ?, Neues Museum Weserburg Bremen, Bremen
 2005: Collective Creativity, Kunsthalle Fridericianum, Kassel
 2003: In den Schluchten des Balkan, Kunsthalle Fridericianum, Kassel
 2002: In Search of Balkania, Neue Galerie, Graz
 2000: Chinese Whispers, Apex Art Gallery, New York
 1999: Aspekte / Positionen, Museum Moderner Kunst SLW, Wien
 1993: The Horse who Sings, Museum of Contemporary Art, Sydney
 1990: Zeichen im Fluss, Museum des 20. Jahrhunderts, Wien
 1976 :Confrontation, Gallery of Contemporary Art, Zagreb

Literature
 Djuric, Dubravka – Suvakovis, Misko (Hrsg.): Impossible Histories: Historic Avant-Gardes, Neo-Avant-Gardes, and Post-Avant-Gardes in Yugoslavia, 1918–1991, 2003, .
 Martek, Vlado: Volim Citati Poeziju, Zabreb 2001, .
 Martek, Vlado: Predpoezija, Zagreb 2008,  .
 Martek, Vlado,  Akcije pisanja, Zagreb 1997, .
 Stipančić, Branka: Vlado Martek – Poezija u akciji / Poetry in Action, Zagreb 2010.

References

External links
 Badischer Kunstverein: Why here is always somewhere else? 03/21/2012.
 Djurdjević, Miloš: Croatia. Vlado Martek. 
 Djuri, Dubravka: Croatia. Vlado Martkes Pre-Poetry, 04/01/2011.
 Koščević, Želimir: Martek Stays. Vlado Martek, Studio Golo Brdo, 06/27/2007.
 Krogemann, Bettina: Unter der Tauchglocke, Artnet Magazine, 06/08/2011.
 Kuad Gallery: Vlado Martek. 
 N.N.: Vlado Martek. Language in Freedom, Trieste, 04/15/2011.
 N.N.: Who killed the Painting? Werke aus der Sammlung Block, 08/21/2009.
 Stipancic, Branka: Vlado Martek. Read Mallarmé, 09/10/2011.

1951 births
Artists from Zagreb
Living people